The Italian composer Gioachino Rossini (1792–1868) is best known for his operas, of which he wrote 39 between 1806 and 1829. Adopting the opera buffa style of Domenico Cimarosa and Giovanni Paisiello, Rossini became the dominant composer of Italian opera during the first half of the 19th-century. Though working at the same time as Vincenzo Bellini and Gaetano Donizetti, he was recognized by his contemporaries as the greatest Italian composer of his time, an evaluation which has lasted into the 21st-century.

This edition identifies individual operas by their EC numbers.

List of operas

Pasticci with Rossini's permission

Other pasticci utilising Rossini's music

Notes and references

Notes

References

Sources

External links

"The thirty-nine operas of Gioachino Rossini" by Robert J. Farr, 16 November 2005, musicweb-international.com
A Pega Ladra: drama em 2 actos, 1853 publication, Portuguese, digitized by BYU on archive.org

 
Lists of operas by composer